The Cobb Baronetcy, of Adderbury in Oxfordshire, was a title in the Baronetage of England. It was created on 9 December 1662 for Thomas Cobb. The title became extinct on the death of the third Baronet on 29 March 1762.

Cobb baronets, of Adderbury (1662)

Sir Thomas Cobb, 1st Baronet (1627– February 1699)
Sir Edward Cobb, 2nd Baronet (c. 1676–1744)
Sir George Cobb, 3rd Baronet (c. 1670–29 March 1762)

References

Extinct baronetcies in the Baronetage of England